The Nickolai Wargelin Homestead, in Valley County, Idaho southeast of McCall, Idaho, was built in 1918. It was listed on the National Register of Historic Places in 1982.

Architecture: Finnish Log Structures
Historic function: Domestic; Agriculture/subsistence
Historic subfunction: Single Dwelling; Agricultural Outbuildings; Secondary Structure
Criteria: architecture/engineering

See also
Wargelin-Warila Homestead, NRHP-listed in Montana

References

National Register of Historic Places in Valley County, Idaho
Houses completed in 1918
Finnish-American culture in Idaho
Finnish-American history